The Men's team sprint was held on 19 October 2012. 11 nations participated.

Medalists

Results
Fastest 2 teams raced for gold and 3rd and 4th teams raced for bronze.

Qualifying
It was held at 14:35.

Finals
The finals were held at 20:22.

References

Men's team sprint
European Track Championships – Men's team sprint